American musician Marié Digby has released six studio albums, four extended plays, five singles, and six music videos. Her debut single, a cover of Rihanna's "Umbrella", was released in 2007 and charted on the Billboard Bubbling Under Hot 100 Singles and Adult Top 40 charts. This song and her only other charted single to date - 2008's "Say It Again" - preceded her debut album, Unfold, which debuted at number 29 on the Billboard 200 upon its April 2008 release.

Albums

Studio albums

Extended plays

Singles

Music videos

Notes

References

Discographies of American artists
Pop music discographies